Imingfjellet  is a mountain in Nore og Uvdal Municipality in Buskerud, Norway.

External links
Imingfjellet (mapcarta)

Mountains of Viken